Dimorphotheca ecklonis, also known as Cape marguerite, African daisy, Van Staden's river daisy, Sundays river daisy, white daisy bush, blue-and-white daisy bush, star of the veldt is an ornamental plant that is native to South Africa. It is now regarded as a weed in parts of Australia, particularly Victoria and Western Australia.

Features
It is an evergreen, perennial dwarf shrub with the stature heights of 25 to 50 centimeters. The leaves measure 5 to 10 × 1 to 4 inches and are glandular fluffy, sessile, elliptical, slightly succulent, narrow obovate and entire or serrated. The heads are on 15 to 20 centimeters long stems and have a diameter of 5 to 8 centimeters. The bracts are 13 to 16 millimeters long and glandular. The rays are white above and reddish blue below. The disc is dark blue or purple. The fruit surface is net-wrinkled.

The flowering period is from April to September in the northern hemisphere. The plant is said to contain hydrocyanic acid, making it poisonous to livestock.

Distribution
It is native to the Eastern Cape in Uitenhage and Humansdorp, in South Africa, and is found on wet grass and in river beds at altitudes up to 300 meters.

Cultivation
It is widely used as an ornamental plant in pots, summer borders and balcony boxes. It is cultivated one-year old. There are numerous hybrids and varieties, including upright, up to 1.5 meters high and half-low. This species has been in culture since about 1920. It thrives best in full sun, in poor, sandy soil.

References

Bibliography

External links 
 Dimorphotheca ecklonis entry in plantZAfrica.com
 Recent Incursions of Weeds Into Australia 1971-1995

ecklonis
Flora of South Africa